Electro Assassin was the music project of London-based composer Kevin Gould, known for his work with Johnson Engineering Co. Ian Taylor provided vocals to the project between 1990 and 1994. The group released three albums: Jamming the Voice of the Universe (1992),  Bioculture (1993) and The Divine Invasion (1995).

History
Electro Assassin was founded out of London in 1990 by Kevin Gould as an outlet for his solo compositions. Gould had previously performed in Johnson Engineering Co. Electro Assassin released Jamming the Voice of the Universe in 1992 by Hyperium Records and Concrete Productions. The second album was released in 1993 by Hyperium and titled Bioculture and represented vocalist Ian Taylor's final release with the band. The band's third album, titled The Divine Invasion, was released in 1995 by Synthetic Symphony and Cyber-Tec Records. In September of that year the album was reissued in the United States by Fifth Colvmn Records.

Discography
Studio albums
 Jamming the Voice of the Universe (1992, Hyperium/Concrete)
 Bioculture (1993, Hyperium)
 The Divine Invasion (1995, Synthetic Symphony/Cyber-Tec)

Compilation appearances
 FMCD Volume 8 - April 1994 (1994, Future Music)
 Hy! ...To Hypersonic (The Hyperium Compilation | Part II) (1992, Hyperium)
 Hyperium Promo-Sampler (1992, Hyperium)
 Hy! From Hypnotic to Hypersonic (1992, Hyperium)
 Electronic Youth Vol.1 (1993, Music Research)
 Funky Alternatives Seven (1993, Concrete)
 The Digital Space Between Vol. 2 (1995, Cleopatra)
 Cyber-Tec America (1995, Invisible)
 Untitled (1996, Infected, Cyber-Tec)
 Industrial Virus (1997, Dressed to Kill)
 Industrial Hazard (1998, Dressed to Kill)
 Industrial Armageddon (1998, Age of Panik)
 Sacrilege: A Tribute to Front 242 (1999, Cleopatra)
 Industrial Meltdown (1999, Cleopatra)
 Hardware (1999, MCT)

References

External links 
 
 

Musical groups established in 1990
Musical groups disestablished in 1999
1990 establishments in the United Kingdom
1999 disestablishments in the United Kingdom
English electronic music groups
British industrial music groups
British electronic body music groups
Fifth Colvmn Records artists